Michael Glöckner (born 27 May 1969) is a German cyclist. He won the gold medal in the Men's team pursuit at the 1992 Summer Olympics along with Jens Lehmann, Stefan Steinweg, Guido Fulst and Andreas Walzer.

References 

1969 births
Living people
People from Ehingen
Sportspeople from Tübingen (region)
Cyclists at the 1992 Summer Olympics
Olympic cyclists of Germany
Olympic gold medalists for Germany
German male cyclists
Olympic medalists in cycling
Cyclists from Baden-Württemberg
Medalists at the 1992 Summer Olympics
German track cyclists